The Commission on Growth and Development (informally known as the Growth Commission) was an independent body chaired by American economist Michael Spence that brought together 22 policy-makers, academics, and business leaders to examine various aspects of economic growth and development.

Launched in 2006, the Commission set out to take stock of the state of theoretical and empirical knowledge on economic growth with a view to drawing implications for policy for the current and future policymakers.  Its work culminated in two publications – The Growth Report:  Strategies for Sustained growth and Inclusive Development in May 2008 – and Post-Crisis Growth in Developing Countries : A Special Report of the Commission on Growth and Development on the Implications of the 2008 Financial Crisis in October 2009.  Five thematic volumes and nearly 70 working papers were also published by the Commission.
The Growth Commission’s work was sponsored by the governments of Australia, the Netherlands, the United Kingdom, and Sweden, the William and Flora Hewlett Foundation, and the World Bank Group.  The group's activities formally ended in June 2010.

Commissioners 
 Montek Ahluwalia (India), Minister of Planning
 Edmar Bacha (Brazil), Board member of Banco Itau, former President of the National Bank for Economic and Social Development
 Dr. Boediono (Indonesia), Coordinating Minister for Economic Affairs
 Lord John Browne (Great Britain), Former CEO, British Petroleum
 Kemal Dervis (Turkey), Administrator of the United Nations Development Programme, former Minister of Finance of Turkey
 Alejandro Foxley, (Chile), Minister of Foreign Affairs
 Han Duck-Soo (Korea), Chairman of the Presidential Committee on Facilitating KORUS FTA Finalization
 Goh Chok Tong (Singapore), Senior Minister and Chairman of the Monetary Authority of Singapore
 Danuta Huebner (Poland), Member of the European Commission
 Carin Jaemtin (Sweden), Former Minister for International Development Cooperation
 Pablo Kuczynski (Peru), Former Prime Minister
 Danny Leipziger (USA), World Bank, Vice President, PREM
 Trevor Manuel (South Africa), Minister of Finance
 Mahmoud Mohieldin (Egypt), Minister of Investment
 Ngozi N. Okonjo-Iweala (Nigeria), Managing Director, World Bank
 Robert Rubin (USA), Director, Chairman of the Executive Committee and Member of the Office of the Chairman of Citigroup, is the former Secretary of the US Treasury
 Robert Solow (USA), Professor Emeritus, Massachusetts Institute of Technology (MIT)
 Michael Spence (USA), Nobel Laureate, Chair of the Growth Commission, former Dean of Stanford Graduate Business School
 Sir K. Dwight Venner (Saint Kitts and Nevis, West Indies) Governor of the Eastern Caribbean Bank
 Hiroshi Watanabe (Japan), President and CEO of the Japan Bank for International Cooperation (JBIC)
 Ernesto Zedillo (Mexico), Director of the Yale Center Study of Globalization, former President of Mexico
 Zhou Xiaochuan (China), Governor of the People’s Bank of China

References

External links
 The Growth Commission Website (archived)

International development agencies